is a Japanese right-handed foil fencer, 2019 team Asian champion, 2019 individual Asian champion, and 2021 Olympian. 

Shikine competed in the 2020 Tokyo Olympic Games.

Medal Record

World Championship

Asian Championship

Grand Prix

World Cup

References

External links 
 

Living people
1997 births
People from Ōita (city)
Sportspeople from Ōita Prefecture
Japanese male foil fencers
Asian Games medalists in fencing
Asian Games bronze medalists for Japan
Fencers at the 2018 Asian Games
Medalists at the 2018 Asian Games
Universiade medalists in fencing
Universiade gold medalists for Japan
Medalists at the 2017 Summer Universiade
World Fencing Championships medalists
Fencers at the 2020 Summer Olympics
Olympic fencers of Japan